This is a list of protected areas of Somalia. Protected areas include national parks and 
wildlife reserves. The boundaries and areas of Somalia's protected areas are not reported, and there has been little formal protection or management of most areas since the collapse of Somalia's central government in 1991.

National parks
 Arbawerow National Park
 Baraako madow National Park
 Buloburto National Park
 Bushbushle National Park
 Daalo Mountain
 Ga'an Libah National Park
 Hobyo National Park
 las'anod National Park
 Ras Hafun National Park
 Shoonto National Park
 Taleh-El Chebet National Park
 Zayla National Park
Jilib National Park
Kismayo National Park
Lag Badana National Park

Wildlife reserves
 Awdhegle-G Wildlife Reserve
 Boja swamps Wildlife Reserve
 Dandoole Wildlife Reserve
 Eji Obaale Wildlife Reserve
 Far Wamo Wildlife Reserve
 Haradere Wildlife Reserve
 Jowhar Wildlife Reserve
 Lack Badana Wildlife Reserve
 Lack Dare Wildlife Reserve

See also
Cabdibille game reserve
Waamo Idow national park
Mataan Robley Gorges
Calishoraa Ruins
Robaa Galmo fortress

References

Somalia
 
National parks
National parks
Somalia